Bodo Thyssen (1918–2004) was a German industrialist and medical doctor, son of Hans Thyssen and wife and grandson of Josef Thyssen, the younger brother of August Thyssen.

His businesses included Telefonbau & Normalzeit, Thyssen-Heizkessel and Melderwerke.

In 1969 he married Renate Thyssen-Henne (née Kerkhoff), whom he later divorced, without issue, though his stepdaughter and stepson had taken his surname. At the beginning of the 1970s, Bodo Thyssen and his wife Renate Thyssen established the "Thyssen Privatklinik" in Prien by the Chiemsee lake.

See also
 Thyssen
 Thyssen family

1918 births
2004 deaths
Businesspeople from Bavaria
German industrialists
Bodo
German businesspeople in the healthcare industry
Physicians from Bavaria